Events pertaining to world affairs in 2018, national politics, public policy, government, world economics, and international business, that took place in various nations, regions, organizations, around the world in 2018.

Events pertaining to politics, government, public policy, and international affairs, that took place in various nations, regions, organizations, around the world in 2018.

By region

Africa
 8–9 July 2018
 2018 Eritrea–Ethiopia summit - A bilateral summit where Eritrean President Isaias Afwerki and Ethiopian Prime Minister Abiy Ahmed signed a joint declaration on 9 July, formally ending the border conflict between both countries. The joint statement was considered to close all chapters regarding the Eritrean–Ethiopian War (1998–2000) and the following Eritrean–Ethiopian border conflict (2000–2018).

Asia
11 March 2018.
China's National People's Congress approves a constitutional change that removes term limits for its leaders, granting Xi Jinping the status of "President for Life". Xi is also the General Secretary of the Chinese Communist Party (paramount leader).
October 2018
Prince MBS of Saudi Arabia sends a group of government agents to murder prominent critic, Jamal Khashoggi. His death is just a few days before his sixtieth birthday.

Europe
 12 July 2018.
 2018 Brussels summit of the North Atlantic Treaty Organization (NATO)  held in Brussels, Belgium, on 11 and 12 July 2018.NATO announces that a new Cyber Operations Command will be established to coordinate efforts to protect cyber-security.
 25 October 2018
 After the monthly meeting of the ECB Governing Council, the ECB announces that it will not change benchmark interest rates.  It also states that it plans to end quantitative easing by the end of 2018.
 15 November 2018 
 United Kingdom Brexit Secretary Dominic Raab resigns, as does Work and Pensions Secretary  Esther McVey and several other ministers because of disagreement with terms of a draft Brexit deal announced on November 14, 2018.

North America
 6 November 2018
 United States midterm elections, 2018

South America 

 20 May
 2018 Venezuelan presidential election
 9 December
 2018 Venezuelan municipal elections

By topic

General world affairs and international relations
 12 July 2018.
 2018 Brussels summit of the North Atlantic Treaty Organization (NATO)  held in Brussels, Belgium, on 11 and 12 July 2018.NATO announces that a new Cyber Operations Command will be established to coordinate efforts to protect cyber-security.
 15 November 2018
 United Kingdom Brexit Secretary Dominic Raab resigns, as does Work and Pensions Secretary  Esther McVey and several other ministers because of disagreement with terms of a draft Brexit deal announced on November 14, 2018.

Politics
 6 November 2018
 United States midterm elections, 2018

Economics and banking
 25 October 2018
 After the monthly meeting of the ECB Governing Council, the ECB announces that it will not change benchmark interest rates.  It also states that it plans to end quantitative easing by the end of 2018.

References

Politics and government
 
Politics by year
2018 in international relations
Political timelines of the 2010s by year
2010s in politics
21st century in politics